Bluesville Time is an album by pianist Cedar Walton which was recorded in 1985 and released on the Dutch Criss Cross Jazz label.

Reception

Allmusic rated the album 4 stars. The Penguin Guide to Jazz praised the selection of material, but wrote that "the playing, Higgins apart, isn't quite crisp enough".

Track listing 
All compositions by Cedar Walton except as indicated
 "Rubber Man" - 8:47
 "Naima" (John Coltrane) - 9:27 		
 "Bluesville" (Sonny Red) - 5:44
 "I Remember Clifford" (Benny Golson) - 9:44
 "Ojos de Rojo" - 7:10
 "'Round Midnight" (Thelonious Monk) - 4:46 Bonus track on CD 		
 "Without a Song" (Edward Eliscu, Billy Rose, Vincent Youmans) - 11:45 Bonus track on CD

Personnel 
Cedar Walton - piano 
Dale Barlow - tenor saxophone
David Williams - bass
Billy Higgins - drums

References 

Cedar Walton albums
1986 albums
Criss Cross Jazz albums